The Mason Williams Phonograph Record is an album by classical guitarist and composer Mason Williams (with various accompaniment) released in 1968. It is Williams's most successful and most recognized album, and contains the instrumental "Classical Gas," his best known song. Mason Williams won two Grammy awards, for Best Pop Instrumental Performance and Best Instrumental Theme, and Mike Post won Best Instrumental Arrangement on the song. In Canada, the album reached #16.

Track listing

Personnel 

Musicians
 Mason Williams – main performer and composer, guitar
 Carl Fortina – accordion
 Bob West, Lawrence Knechtel, and Lyle Ritz – bass
 Armand Kaproff, Jerome Kessler, Jesse Ehrlich, and Joe DiTullio – cello
 Lyle Ritz – double bass
 James Beck Gordon – drums
 David Duke and William Hinshaw – French horn, tuben 
 Alvin Casey, David Cohen, James Burton, and Michael Deasy – guitar
 Gail Levant – harp
 Gary L. Coleman and Gene Estes – percussion
 Lawrence Knechtel and Michael Melvoin – piano
 Richard J. Hyde, Hoyt Bohannon, Lew McCreary, and Richard Leith – trombone
 David Burk, Emanuel Moss, George Kast, Harry Bluestone, Israel Baker, Jack Gootkin, Jimmy Getzoff, Jerry Reisler, John Vidor, Ralph Schaeffer, Robert Korda, Robert Sushel, Sidney Sharp, Stan Plummer, Tibor Zelig, and William Kurasch – violin
 Jim Horn and Tommy Scott – woodwind

Production
 Mike Post – producer
 Phil Kaye – effects
 Stan Cornyn – liner notes

References

External links 
 
 
 http://www.45worlds.com/vinyl/album/ws1729

1968 albums
Mason Williams albums
Warner Records albums
Albums produced by Mike Post